Lh. Atoll Education Centre (LHAEC; ޅ. އަތޮޅު ތަޢުލީމީ މަރުކަޒު) is the main school of Lhaviyani (Faadhippolhu) Atoll. It is an autonomous school funded by the government of Maldives.

History
Its foundation was laid on 4 June 1981, Thursday (1 Shaubaan 1400) by Lh. Atoll Chief Mr. Abdula jamil. It was officially opened by the Hon. Minister of Health Mr. Ismail Rashed on 10 March 1984, Saturday (7 Jumaadhul Aakhiraa 1404).

School houses

Extracurricular activities

Second Lhaviyani Scout Group
Second Lhaviyani Scout Group is the longest running co-curricular activity in Lh. Atoll Education Centre, the only school located in Hinnavaru. It was registered on 29 June 1987 as 31st Male' with 36 Cub Scouts, 40 Scouts, one Cub Leader and two Scout Leaders.

Cub Scouts

Girl Guides

Little Maids

Clubs and associations
Clubs and associations include Environment Club, Business Club, Science Club, Mathematics Club, English Literary Association (ELA) and Dhivehi Literary Association (DLA).

Facilities
LHAEC provides students and teachers various facilities including indoor and outdoor games, laboratories and internet.

Events

LHAEC conducts various events at school level including maths quiz, business quiz, science exhibition, football and tournaments.

External links
 Ministry of Education

Schools in the Maldives
Educational institutions established in 1984
1984 establishments in the Maldives